The Dominican Civil War, also known as the April Revolution, took place between April 24, 1965, and September 3, 1965, in Santo Domingo, Dominican Republic. It started when civilian and military supporters of the overthrown democratically-elected president Juan Bosch ousted the militarily-installed president Donald Reid Cabral from office. The second coup prompted General Elías Wessin y Wessin to organize elements of the military loyal to President Reid ("loyalists"), initiating an armed campaign against the "constitutionalist" rebels. In riposte, the dissidents passed out Cristóbal carbines and machine guns to several thousand civilian sympathizers and adherents. Allegations of foreign communist support for the rebels led to a United States intervention in the conflict (codenamed Operation Power Pack), which later transformed into an Organization of American States occupation of the country by the Inter-American Peace Force. Elections were held in 1966, in the aftermath of which Joaquín Balaguer was elected into the presidential seat. Later in the same year, foreign troops departed from the country.

Background

Juan Emilio Bosch Gaviño was the first democratically elected president of the Dominican Republic. Sworn into office in February 1963, he tried to implement a number of social reforms, which caused the anger of the business magnates and members of the army, who initiated a rumor campaign that accused Bosch of being a communist. On September 25, 1963, a group of twenty-five senior military commanders, led by General Elías Wessin y Wessin, expelled Bosch from the country and installed Donald Reid Cabral as the new president. Reid failed to gather popular support, and several factions prepared to launch a counter-coup; Constitutionalists under Bosch, a group in the Dominican army under Peña Taveras, supporters of the former Dominican Revolutionary Party leader Nicolás Silfa and plotters siding with Joaquín Balaguer.

Civil war

April Revolution

On April 24, 1965, three junior officers requested a meeting with President Donald Reid Cabral, who rejected the offer after he had received news of a suspected anti-government plot. When Chief of Staff Riviera Cuesta was instead sent to discuss with the officers at the August 16 military camp, he was immediately detained. A group of military constitutionalists and Dominican Revolutionary Party (DRP) supporters then seized the Radio Santo Domingo building and issued calls of sedition while Constitutionalist officers distributed weapons and Molotov cocktails to their civilian comrades. The transmissions prompted the garrison of the February 27 camp and a unit of the Dominican Navy's frogmen to defect. Large numbers of police officers abandoned their positions and changed into civilian clothing.

The following day, Reid appointed General Wessin y Wessin as the new chief of staff. Wessin rallied the government troops, branded them Loyalists, and announced his plans of suppressing the rebellion. At 10:30 am rebels stormed the presidential palace and arrested Reid. Several hours later, four Loyalist P-51 Mustangs conducted aerial bombings of the National Palace and other Constitutionalist positions, and one plane was shot down during the incident. A single Loyalist vessel, on the river Ozama, also bombarded the palace. Fearing that a mob, which had gathered at the palace, would lynch Reid, the rebel commander Francisco Caamaño allowed him to escape, as Reid had already lost the support of the Loyalists. The majority of the DRP leadership fled the capital, and Constitutionalists mobilized a total of 5,000 armed civilians and 1,500 members of the military. On April 26, José Rafael Molina Ureña was declared the provisional president, and large crowds gathered in the streets to demand Bosch's return from exile.

US intervention
In the meantime, US diplomats in Santo Domingo initiated preparations for evacuating 3,500 U.S citizens. Later that day, 1,500 Loyalist troops, supported by armored cars and tanks, marched from the San Isidro Air Base, captured Duarte Bridge, and took position on the west bank of the Ozama River. A second force, consisting of 700 soldiers, left San Cristóbal and attacked the western suburbs of Santo Domingo. Rebels overran the Fortaleza Ozama police headquarters and took 700 prisoners. On April 28, armed civilians attacked the Villa Consuelo police station and executed all of the police officers who survived the initial skirmish. One US Marine battalion landed in Haina and later moved to Hotel Embajador, where it provided assistance in the upcoming airlifts. During the night, 684 civilians were airlifted to USS Boxer. One US Marine was killed by a rebel sniper during the operation.

On April 29, the US ambassador to the Dominican Republic, William Tapley Bennett, who had sent numerous reports to US President Lyndon Johnson, reported that the situation had reached life-threatening proportions for US citizens and that the rebels received foreign support. Bennett stressed that the US had to act immediately, as the creation of an international coalition would be time-consuming. Contrary to the suggestions of his advisers, Johnson authorized the transformation of evacuation operations into a large-scale military intervention through Operation Power Pack, which was aimed to prevent the development of what he saw as a second Cuban Revolution. It was the first overt U.S. military intervention in Latin America in more than 30 years, although it came on the heels of U.S.-backed coups in Guatemala and Brazil, as well as ongoing covert interference in Cuba.

At 2:16 a.m. on April 30, 1965, the 3rd Brigade of the 82nd Airborne Division landed at the San Isidro Air Base and started the US military intervention in the conflict. During the next couple of hours, two brigade combat teams and heavy equipment were also dispatched. At sunrise the 1st Battalion, 508th Infantry Regiment moved up the San Isidoro highway, securing a position east of the Duarte bridge. The 1st Battalion 505th Infantry Regiment remained at the airbase and sent out patrols to the perimeter. A force of 1,700 Marines of the 6th Marine Expeditionary Unit occupied an area containing a number of foreign embassies. The locale was proclaimed an International Security Zone by the Organization of American States (OAS). Earlier in the day, the OAS also issued a resolution calling the combatants to end all hostilities. At 4:30 p.m., representatives of the loyalists, the rebels, and the US military signed a ceasefire that was to take effect at 11:45 p.m. That timing favored the demoralized Loyalists, who had lost control of Ciudad Colonial.

On May 5, the OAS Peace Committee arrived in Santo Domingo, and a second definite ceasefire agreement was signed, which ended the main phase of the civil war. Under the Act of Santo Domingo, the OAS was tasked with overseeing the implementation of the peace deal as well as distributing food and medication through the capital. The treaties failed to prevent some violations such as small-scale firefights and sniper fire. A day later, OAS members established the Inter-American Peace Force (IAPF) with the goal of serving as a peacekeeping formation in the Dominican Republic. The IAPF had 1,748 Brazilian, Paraguayan, Nicaraguan, Costa Rican, Salvadoran and Honduran troops and was headed by Brazilian General Hugo Panasco Alvim, with US Army General Bruce Palmer serving as his deputy commander.

United States withdrawal

On May 26, US forces began gradually withdrawing from the island. On June 15, the Constitutionalists launched a second and final attempt to expand the boundaries of their stronghold. In the bloodiest battle of the intervention, the rebels began their attack on US outposts. Using the greatest firepower yet, they used tear gas grenades, .50-caliber machine guns, 20 mm guns, mortars, rocket launchers, and tank fire. The 1st battalions of the 505th and 508th Infantry quickly went on the offensive. Two days of fighting cost the US five KIA and 31 WIA. The OAS forces, whose orders were to remain at their defenses, counted five wounded. The Constitutionalists claimed 67 dead and 165 injured.

The first postwar elections were held on July 1, 1966, and pit the conservative Reformist Party candidate, Joaquín Balaguer, against the former president Juan Emilio Bosch Gaviño. Balaguer – with the support of the US – emerged victorious in the elections after he built his campaign on promises of reconciliation. On September 21, 1966, the last OAS peacekeepers withdrew from the island, which ended the foreign intervention in the conflict.

See also

 History of the Dominican Republic
 Football War
 United States occupation of the Dominican Republic (1916–24)
 Bay of Pigs Invasion
 Johnson Doctrine
 United States involvement in regime change
 Latin America–United States relations

References

Further reading

External links
 Lyndon Johnson - On the Situation in the Dominican Republic
 Dominican Republic PSYOP
 
 
 
 
 
 
 
 
 

History of the Dominican Republic
20th century in the Dominican Republic
1965 in the Dominican Republic
1966 in the Dominican Republic
Conflicts in 1965
Conflicts in 1966
United States Marine Corps in the 20th century
Cold War conflicts
Invasions of the Dominican Republic
American military occupations
Invasions by the United States
United States involvement in regime change
Presidency of Lyndon B. Johnson
Dominican Republic–United States military relations
Wars involving the Dominican Republic
Wars involving the United States
Wars involving Brazil
Wars involving Costa Rica
Wars involving El Salvador
Wars involving Honduras
Wars involving Nicaragua
Wars involving Paraguay
Proxy wars
Articles containing video clips